John Peter Michael Scawen Lytton, 5th Earl of Lytton, 18th Baron Wentworth,  (born 7 June 1950), styled Viscount Knebworth between 1951 and 1985, is a British chartered surveyor, peer, and member of the House of Lords.

Background and education
Lytton is the son of Noel Lytton, 4th Earl of Lytton and the former Clarissa Mary Palmer.

He is a descendant of the poet and adventurer Lord Byron (born 1788) via his daughter Ada Lovelace (born 1815), who was arguably the world's first computer programmer. Her daughter Anne (born 1837) married the poet Wilfrid Scawen Blunt; their daughter Judith Blunt-Lytton was Noel's mother and thus John's grandmother. He is in addition a descendant of Edward Bulwer-Lytton.

He was educated at Downside School and graduated from the University of Reading with a BSc honours degree in Estate Management, in 1972.

Career
After spending thirteen years in the Inland Revenue Valuation Office and some additional years with surveying firms Permutt Brown & Co and Cubitt & West, he set up the practice of John Lytton & Co., Chartered Surveyors, in January, 1988. He succeeded his father in the earldom in 1985. He lost his seat in the House of Lords after the passing of the House of Lords Act 1999. However, on 11 May 2011 he won a hereditary peer by-election and regained his seat there, where he sits as a crossbencher (i.e. not a member of a political party).

Lord Lytton has taken his Byronic descent to heart and has contributed to the Newstead Byron Society Review. He has also spoken before the Byron Society on his family history.

Furthermore, he now works part-time in the construction industry and is patron to the Chartered Association of Building Engineers.

Family
On 7 June 1980, Lord Lytton was married to Ursula Alexandra Komoly, a daughter of Anton Komoly of Vienna, Austria. They have three children:

 Lady Katrina Mary Noel Lytton (b. 1985)
 Philip Anthony Scawen Lytton, Viscount Knebworth (b. 1989)
 Hon. Wilfrid Thomas Scawen Lytton (b. 1992).

He inherited Newbuildings Place in 1984 from his aunt, Lady Anne Lytton. His cousins maintain the family estate, Knebworth House. He is a Deputy Lieutenant for West Sussex.

References

External links

 The Earl of Lytton at UK Parliament
The Official Earl of Lytton Website: The Lytton Family Archives
Knebworth House website
The International Byron Society

1950 births
Living people
20th-century English nobility
21st-century English nobility
People educated at Downside School
Alumni of the University of Reading
18
105
Deputy Lieutenants of West Sussex
Crossbench hereditary peers
Lytton
Lytton